George Ramsdell Lucas Jr. (born September 8, 1949) is an American philosopher and a professor of ethics and public policy at the Graduate School of Public Policy at the Naval Postgraduate School. Previously he was the Distinguished Chair in Ethics in the Vice Admiral James B. Stockdale Center for Ethical Leadership at the U.S. Naval Academy. Lucas is a former president of the Metaphysical Society of America (2016).

Books
 Ethics and Cyber Warfare (Oxford University Press, 2017)
 Military Ethics: What Everyone Needs to Know (Oxford University Press, 2016)
 The Routledge Handbook of Military Ethics (Routledge, 2015)
 Anthropologists in Arms: the Ethics of Military Anthropology (AltaMira Press, 2009)
 Perspectives on Humanitarian Military Intervention (University of California Press, 2001)
 Ethics and Military Strategy in the 21st Century: Moving Beyond Clausewitz (Routledge, 2019)

References

20th-century American philosophers
Philosophy academics
1949 births
Presidents of the Metaphysical Society of America
Place of birth missing (living people)
Living people
Naval Postgraduate School faculty
United States Naval Academy faculty
American ethicists